Lenart Oblak (born 27 June 1991) is a Slovenian biathlete. He competed in the 2018 Winter Olympics.

References

1991 births
Sportspeople from Kranj
Living people
Biathletes at the 2018 Winter Olympics
Slovenian male biathletes
Olympic biathletes of Slovenia
21st-century Slovenian people